The 2022 Peru Cup season, the largest amateur tournament of Peruvian football. The Regional Stage starts in 12 February, and the National Stage starts in November. The winner of the National Stage will be promoted to the Liga 1 and the runner-up will be promoted to the Liga 2.

On 23 August 2022, it was announced that starting from 2023, the Copa Perú would only give promotion to Liga 2 due to the reforms of Peruvian football by the FPF, meaning that this Copa Perú edition was the last that awarded its winning team promotion to the Peruvian top flight.

Departmental stage
Departmental Stage: 2022 Ligas Departamentales del Peru

The following list shows the teams that qualified for the National Stage.

National Stage
In 2022 the National Stage has grown to 50 teams, and the new National Stage, designed by matchVision, is played under Regional using the POT System, with all the Regions of Peru represented. The National Stage starts in the second week of September.

This phase features the 50 teams that qualified from the Departmental Stage. Each team plays 3 games at home and 3 games away, for a total of 6 games against 3 different geographical rivals. The departmental stage winners only play against departmental runners-up, and vice versa. All the teams are positioned in one general table. After 6 matches, the team in places 1 to 32 are qualified directly to the Round of 32. The teams in places 33 to 50 are eliminated.

The winner of the National Stage will be promoted to the 2023 Liga 1 and the runner-up of the National Stage will be promoted to the 2023 Liga 2.

League table

Round 1
The round was played between 17 September and 18 September.

|-

|-
|}

Round 2
The round was played between 24 September and 25 September.

|-

|-
|}

Round 3
The round was played between 28 September and 30 September.

|-

|-
|}

Round 4
The round was played between 4 October and 5 October.

|-

|-
|}

Round 5
The round was played between 8 October and 9 October.

|-

|-
|}

Round 6

|-

|-
|}

Final Rounds

Round of 32

|-
|}

Round of 16

|-
|}

Quarterfinals

|-
|}

Final group stage
The final group stage, colloquially known as La Finalísima'', will be played by the four semifinalists at the Estadio Iván Elías Moreno. The team with the most points will be declared the winner and be promoted to the 2023 Liga 1.

Round 1

Round 2

Round 3

Top scorers

Source: Futbolperuano.com

See also
 2022 Liga 1
 2022 Liga 2

References

External links
 Official Website
  Dechalaca Copa Peru
  Semanario Pasión

2022
Peru
2022 in Peruvian football